The James Street Bridge is a car crossing of the Kansas River at Kansas City.  It is the second bridge at this location.

The first bridge was built in 1904 as a two lane, thru-truss bridge.  The second bridge was built in 1987, as a two lane girder bridge, but using the 1904 pier from the first bridge.

Bridges over the Kansas River
Bridges in Kansas City, Kansas
Bridges completed in 1904
Bridges completed in 1987
Road bridges in Kansas
1987 establishments in Kansas
Girder bridges in the United States